Wayne, Pennsylvania could refer to:
 Wayne, Chester and Delaware County, Pennsylvania, a Main Line suburb
 Wayne County, Pennsylvania
 Waynesburg, Pennsylvania